Baboucarr Alieu Ceesay (born 1979) is a British actor. He is known for his roles in Guerrilla and Rogue One. He also starred as the main antagonist Pilgrim in season 3 of AMC TV series Into the Badlands.

Early life and education
Ceesay was born in London, England, and grew up in West Africa. He is a dual-national and is of Gambian descent.
He trained at Oxford School of Drama. He has also been involved in many significant projects on stage include The Overwhelming opposite Andrew Garfield and A Midsummer Night's Dream. He studied Microbiology at Imperial College London and also worked as an internal auditor at accounting firm, Deloitte.

Career
Ceesay's first major role was in a horror/comedy film, Severance. Two years later he got a role on TV in an episode of Whistleblower. He made guest appearance in multiple British TV shows including Silent Witness, Law & Order: UK, Casualty, Strike Back, Luther, Getting On and Lewis.

In 2013, he worked in the Nigerian film, Half of a Yellow Sun, alongside Thandiwe Newton, Chiwetel Ejiofor, and another rising star, John Boyega. In 2014, he worked on '71.

In 2015, he was cast in NBC's  TV drama, A.D. The Bible Continues as John the Apostle. He also appeared in the thriller Eye in the Sky (2015) and the British action comedy Free Fire (2016), set in Boston, and starring Brie Larson, Sharlto Copley, and Armie Hammer.

He made a return to television with a major role in the Channel 4 drama, National Treasure as Jerome Sharp, Paul Finchley's (played by Robbie Coltrane) lawyer. He then signed up for and starred in a BBC One television movie, Damilola, Our Loved Boy, based on the murder of Damilola Taylor, a ten-year old Nigerian boy living in Peckham, London and the trial which followed. He played the role of the father, Richard Taylor for which he received a BAFTA nomination for Best Actor.

In August 2016, he was cast in the British miniseries, Guerrilla, alongside Idris Elba and Freida Pinto.

In 2019, he was cast as Manny Mensah in the BBC One drama television series Dark Money, with John Schwab and Joseph May. He also performed in the American civil rights drama, The Best of Enemies (2019), 
adapted from a history about school integration and an unlikely alliance in a town in North Carolina.

In 2020, Ceesay was cast as DI Jackson Mendy in the Alibi television series We Hunt Together, with Eve Myles, Hermione Corfield, and Dipo Ola in the other main roles. In 2021, Paul Abbotts crime drama Wolfe premiered on Sky, in which Ceesay plays the title role as a forensic scientist in Manchester.

Personal life
He lives in London with his wife, journalist Anna Ceesay, and their two children.

Filmography

Film

Television

Awards and nominations

References

External links

Living people
1979 births
Black British male actors
English people of Gambian descent
20th-century English male actors
21st-century English male actors
Alumni of the Oxford School of Drama
Gambian actors
Male actors from London